FORFUSCO is a  syllabic abbreviation for the Force maritime des fusiliers marins et commandos, headquartered in Lorient, is the French Navy organisation responsible for and in command of the Fusiliers Marins and Commandos Marine. FORCUSCO is headed by a general officer with the title of Admiral commandant Les fusiliers marins et commandos (ALFUSCO).
 
This force carries out:
 Advanced force and reconnaissance operations from the sea
 Special operations
 Protection of key sites and vessels of the French Navy
 Provision of security for elements of the naval forces.

A 2,700-man strong force, the FORFUSCO is the fourth organic force of the French Navy.

Naval Fusiliers 

Groups and companies of marines are dedicated to the protection of sensitive naval sites (eg military ports, naval aviation bases, communications transmission stations, ammunition depots). The marines are also an integral part of buildings as domestic service - called "bidellerie" in navy slang.

There are seven companies of marines (CIFUSIL), which provide protection for the following sites:
Military port of Cherbourg
Submarine base in Île Longue and pyrotechnics in Guenvénez
Naval aviation base in Lann Bihoué
Communications center in Rosnay, Indre
Communications center in Sainte-Assise, Seine-et-Marne
Communications center in Villepinte France and South Saissac, Aude
Naval aviation base in Lanvéoc-Poulmic (unit created on 1 September 2011 after the closure of the naval aviation base in Nimes-Garons)
Naval Fusilier and Commando training center Lorient

These seven companies send detachments who take turns every four to six months to ensure the protection of the communications centers of Fort-de-France, Mahina Mahina Super and around Papeete, of Ouen Toro in Noumea, and Rufisque near Dakar.
They also support operations of the Naval Commandos (Commandos Marine), augment boarding and landing parties and provide military training to the French navy.

Navy Commandos

The Commandos Marine are trained to targeted actions in places where it is not feasible or appropriate to deploy a larger force. They are primarily used by the French Special Operations Command (COS) since 1992. They are seven in number: Commando Jaubert, Commando Ponchardier, Commando Trepel, Commando de Montfort, Commando de Penfentenyo, Commando Kieffer, and Commando Hubert, each with their own mission specialism.  They have evolved to be broadly comparable to the British SBS.

See also 

 Fusiliers Marins
 Commandos Marine
 List of French paratrooper units
 Fleet Protection Group, Royal Marines
 Special Boat Service

External links 
 Marines and navy commandos Site of the Navy
instruction n° 31/DEF/EMM/PL/ORA June 16, 2005 ron the organization of the FORFUSCO
 Les fusiliers marins et les commandos marine - Musée Site of the national Navy
 Les fusiliers marins et les commandos marine - Magazine LE LIEN Official Website Magazine
 Les fusiliers marins et les commandos marine - École School site marines marine commandos

French naval components